Frating Abbey was reputably an abbey in the village of Frating, in Essex, England. There is no evidence that there was more than a farm raising funds for St Botolph's Abbey, Colchester or Wix Priory from around 1125.

The current house, and first to be named Frating Abbey Farmhouse dates from the mid-nineteenth century, built by Mr Boghurst. It replaced a manor house called Wheelers, mentioned twice in Feet of Fines in 1547  and 1564. Deeds for the Manor of Kirby Hall in 1814 included the Manor of Wheelers with mansion and 200 acres in Great Bentley, Frating and Thorrington.   The first edition of the Ordnance Survey Map showed the location as Wheelers from 1805.

The first mention of Frating Abbey as an address is from 1853 in a letter written to the editor of the Essex Standard and General Advertiser.

References

Monasteries in Essex